The Guthrie Scottish Rite Museum is a museum in Guthrie, Oklahoma.

Location 
The museum is located at the Scottish Rite Temple (Guthrie, Oklahoma), which claims to be one of the world's largest Masonic Centers.  The building was built in 1919 in Classical Revival style and is listed on the U.S. National Register of Historic Places in 1987.

It includes collections displaying items from many of the various Masonic orders, such as the Scottish Rite, the Order of the Eastern Star, and the International Order of the Rainbow for Girls.

See also
List of museums in Oklahoma

References

External links
Official site

Museums in Logan County, Oklahoma
Masonic buildings in Oklahoma
Residential buildings completed in 1919
Masonic museums in the United States
Guthrie, Oklahoma